Mo Duniya Tu Hi Tu is an Indian Oriya drama and romance film released on 11 January 2013.  Starring Anubhav, Barsha and Minaketan in pivotal roles with original soundtrack by Malay Misra. It was a remake of Tamil film Unnidathil Ennai Koduthen.

Synopsis
Heera and his uncle and are petty thieves. One day while escaping from the police they hide in a house, Payal who is a governess in that house taking care of three children when remaining all went out of town. She locks them in her kitchen for one week, that one week relation with Payal changes entire lifestyle of Heera, he starts a new life and slowly falls in love with Payal. Meanwhile, before leaving the house, Heera's uncle steals Payals's diary, Heera starts reading the diary.

Payal is an illegitimate daughter of Lawyer, whose house she is living as a maidservant along with her step mother, her sister, sister's husband and their three children without knowing she is Lawyers's daughter. When one of her relatives Akash comes from abroad, Priya likes him and intend to marry Akash, but Akash needs times to decide. After reading this Heera decides not to express his love and from that day he also makes a habit of writing dairy. Next day when he goes to return the dairy a conflict arises to Payal because of him, she has been thrown out of the house due to confusion. Heera decides to take care of Payal, and builds her career as singer.  Once when Payal gone to foreign tour they blame robbery on Heera and sends him away from the house. Payal returns from the tour, but she does not believe that Heera is a thief and she starts reading his dairy which Heera forgot to take and understands how much love Heera hidden in his heart for her.

At last Payal's family members are making of marriage arrangements of Akash & Payal.  In the function even Heera attends the function, hidden in public, but Payal sees him, she acknowledges her entire success at his feet and decides to marry him, even Akash also appreciates her decision. Finally, movie ends with marriage of Heera & Payal.

Cast
 Anubhav Mohanty as Heera
 Barsa Priyadarshini as Payal
 Minaketan Das		
 Siddhanta Mahapatra in Guest appearance
 Salil Mitra as Heera's uncle
 Prutiviraj Nayak 		
 Jiban Panda		
 Pratibha Panda 
 Debashis Patra as Akash

Review
The film generally received positive reviews from critics. IncredibleOdisha gave it 4 out 5 star in the review and concluded "Mo Duniya Tu Hi Tu is a beautiful film with a social message at the end. Surprise packet of the movie is Salil’s comedy. Barsha Priyadarshini acted very well in emotional scenes. Anubhav scored well in comedy scenes. Sidhant’s performance is also very good." FullOrissa gave it 4.3 out of 5 and commented "Though the film is new and fresh, its unfair to write about the story. But here I would like to mention that the film is New Year gift from Megastar Anubhav to all his fans. He emotes excellent in sentimental sequences and he surely rocks the viewers in songs and dialogues. Brasha Priyadarshini has a tailor-made role and she has really used it to show her acting skills".

Soundtrack
The Music for the film is composed by Malay Misra

Box office
The film did quite brilliant performance at the box office, becoming one of the highest grossing Odia movie of all time.

Awards
 Filmfare Awards East
 Best Oriya Film (Nominated)
 Best Oriya director(Nominated)- Sudhakar Basanta
 Best Oriya Actor (Nominated)-Anubhav Mohanty
 Best Oriya Actress (Nominated)-Barsa Priyadarshini

References

External links
 

2013 films
Odia remakes of Tamil films
2010s Odia-language films